The Portuguese Albums Chart ranks the best-performing albums in Portugal, as compiled by the Associação Fonográfica Portuguesa.

References 

1999 in Portugal
1999 record charts
Portuguese record charts